Cyperus incompressus is a species of sedge that is native to Africa.

The species was first formally described by the botanist Charles Baron Clarke in 1901.

See also
 List of Cyperus species

References

incompressus
Taxa named by Charles Baron Clarke
Plants described in 1901
Flora of Benin
Flora of Burkina Faso
Flora of the Democratic Republic of the Congo
Flora of Guinea
Flora of Ivory Coast
Flora of Madagascar
Flora of Senegal
Flora of Togo
Flora of Sierra Leone